Albert John Henry Stewart (December 3, 1860 – April 30, 1917), was a Canadian politician. He served in the Legislative Assembly of New Brunswick from 1912 to 1917 as an independent member.

References 

1860 births
1917 deaths